Joel Elias Payamps (born April 7, 1994) is a Dominican professional baseball pitcher for the Milwaukee Brewers of Major League Baseball (MLB). He has previously played in MLB for the Arizona Diamondbacks, Toronto Blue Jays, Kansas City Royals, and Oakland Athletics.

Career

Colorado Rockies
Payamps signed with the Colorado Rockies as an international free agent on May 1, 2011. He spent his first two seasons with the DSL Rockies, going 1–3 with a 3.29 ERA in 38 innings in 2011 and going 1–2 with a 3.02 ERA in 59.2 innings in 2012. Payamps spent 2013 with the Grand Junction Rockies, going 4–7 with a 6.06 ERA in 68 innings. He played for the Tri-City Dust Devils in 2014, going 0–2 with a 6.10 ERA in 20.2 innings. 

In 2015, Payamps was released by the Rockies on May 6 and did not appear in any professional games during the season.

Arizona Diamondbacks
Payamps signed a minor league contract with the Arizona Diamondbacks on November 30, 2015. He returned in 2016 and split the season between the Kane County Cougars and the Visalia Rawhide, going a combined 10–8 with a 3.86 ERA in 132.1 innings. His 2017 season was split between Visalia, the Jackson Generals, and the Reno Aces, going a combined 11–7 with a 4.30 ERA in 150.2 innings. He split the 2018 season between Jackson and Reno, going a combined 9–8 with a 3.87 ERA in 116 innings. The Diamondbacks added Payamps to their 40-man roster after the 2018 season.

Payamps opened the 2019 season back with Reno. He suffered a broken foot on April 6 when he was hit by a batted ball. He finished the 2019 minor league season  posting a combined 5–6 record with a 3.89 ERA in 78.2 innings between Jackson and Reno.

On August 17, 2019, the Diamondbacks promoted Payamps to the major leagues. He made his major league debut on August 21 versus the Colorado Rockies, allowing two runs over three innings pitched. With the 2019 Diamondbacks, he appeared in two games, striking out three batters in four innings pitched while allowing two earned runs. In 2020, he again appeared in two games with the Diamondbacks, striking out two batters in three innings, while allowing one earned run. Overall with Arizona, Payamps appeared in four MLB games, pitching to a 3.86 ERA in four appearances without a decision. On November 20, 2020, Payamps was designated for assignment.

Toronto Blue Jays
On November 25, 2020, Payamps was claimed off waivers by the Boston Red Sox. On February 3, 2021, he was designated for assignment after the signing of Garrett Richards was made official. On February 10, Payamps was claimed off waivers by the Toronto Blue Jays. On February 22, he was again claimed off waivers by the Red Sox. On March 6, Payamps was again claimed off waivers by the Blue Jays. Payamps recorded a 2.70 ERA in 22 appearances with the Blue Jays, but was designated for assignment on July 16.

Kansas City Royals
On July 21, 2021, Payamps was traded to the Kansas City Royals in exchange for cash considerations. On August 18, 2022, Payamps was designated for assignment.

Oakland Athletics
On August 20, 2022, Payamps was claimed off waivers by the Oakland Athletics.

Milwaukee Brewers
On December 12, 2022, the Athletics sent Payamps to the Milwaukee Brewers in a three-team trade in which the Atlanta Braves acquired Sean Murphy, the Brewers also acquired William Contreras and Justin Yeager, and the Athletics acquired Manny Piña, Esteury Ruiz, Kyle Muller, Freddy Tarnok, and Royber Salinas.

References

External links

1994 births
Living people
Arizona Diamondbacks players
Buffalo Bisons (minor league) players
Dominican Republic expatriate baseball players in the United States
Dominican Republic national baseball team players
Dominican Summer League Rockies players
Estrellas Orientales players
Grand Junction Rockies players
Jackson Generals (Southern League) players
Kane County Cougars players
Kansas City Royals players
Major League Baseball pitchers
Major League Baseball players from the Dominican Republic
Oakland Athletics players
Omaha Storm Chasers players
People from Santiago de los Caballeros
Reno Aces players
Toronto Blue Jays players
Tri-City Dust Devils players
Visalia Rawhide players
2015 WBSC Premier12 players